Rail transport in Bulgaria is an important mode of transport in Bulgaria.

Infrastructure is owned by National Railway Infrastructure Company, and services are operated by the Bulgarian State Railways.

History
The Ruse – Pliska - Varna, the first Bulgarian railway line, was started in 1864. The Ottoman government had commissioned for it an English company managed by William Gladstone, a politician, and the Barkley brothers, civil engineers. The line, which was 223 km long, was opened in 1866.

In 1870 Baron Maurice de Hirsch started the construction of the Constantinople – Luleburgaz - Edirne - Svilengrad - Plovdiv - Pazardzhik - Belovo railway line, completed three years later.

In 1885, the National Assembly passed the Railway Act, according to which railways in Bulgaria were considered state property and were to be operated by the state. In 1888 Stefan Stambolov's government expropriates the Vakarel – Belovo railway line (built and previously operated by Vitalis) and started operating it. On 1 August, the whole of the Tsaribrod (Dimitrovgrad, Serbia) – Sofia – Belovo railway line was opened for international traffic. The state bought off the Ruse – Varna railway line and started operating it on 10 August. The Bulgarian State Railways were therefore established, based on the Tsaribrod – Sofia – Belovo and Ruse – Varna railway lines. An independent Ministry of Railways, Post Offices and Telegraphs was established in 1912, followed by the State Railway School in 1923.

The next major railway line to be opened was the sub-Balkan railway line, in 1952.

Diesel traction was introduced in 1963 for train traffic with the diesel-hydraulic B′B′ locomotives (class 04), built by SGP. The first electrified line, Sofia – Plovdiv, entered into operation in the same year with the new then class 41, built by Škoda. The first doubled track line, the Sindel – Varna, was completed one year later.

In 1978 operations started on the Varna - Illichovsk ferry line with four train ferries capable of carrying each 104 four-axle  wagons. Break of gauge facility was constructed in Beloslav

Narrow gauge 760 mm (2 feet 49 inch) railways

The scenic Septemvri-Dobrinishte narrow gauge line was finished in 1945. It goes through the station of Avramovo, which is the highest railway station on the Balkans at 1267.4 meters. Further on, it passes through the summer and winter tourist centre of Bansko. The line is 760mm gauge, unelectrified, and is primarily served by diesel locomotives, however there are well preserved steam locomotives that provide attraction tours. Even though it is very attractive to tourists, it is also widely used by the local inhabitants for public transport purposes.

Rail links to adjacent countries
 Greece — Kulata - Promachonas and Svilengrad - Orestiada (Note: passenger services suspended from early 2011, resumed May 2014)
 North Macedonia — via Niš in Serbia or via Thessaloniki in Greece (Note: passenger services suspended from early 2011, resumed May 2014)
 Romania — via Ruse - Giurgiu bridge over the Danube, Kardam - Negru Voda and Vidin - Calafat bridge over the Danube.
 Serbia — via Kalotina - Dimitrovgrad, Serbia
 Turkey — via Svilengrad - Kapikule

See also
Bulgarian State Railways

References

Rail transport